Sophie Jordier (born in France on 4 January 1979), better known by her stage name Lynnsha, is a French R&B-zouk singer. She has released four albums, self-titled Lynnsha (2004), Elle & moi (2008), Île & moi (2013) & Over & Other (2018).

Career
Lynnsha started singing in choirs at the age of five became a lead chorist in an Afro-Caribbean formation and also sang in French choirs.

In 1995, she is discovered by Kaysha who hires her to do backing vocals for Kim, and then for his 1998 album "I'm ready" and other productions.

Lord Kossity proposed for her to sing on his song "Lova Girl" in 2001. She was also featured on Lady Laistee single "Diamant noir" on her debut album. After taking part in Admiral T album, she was featured in "Secret Lover" with Wyclef Jean and in "Trop de peine" as a duet with Calbo from the band Arsenik. She was also part of the musical project "Dis L'Heure 2 Zouk" and had big chart success called "Ma rivale" that reached number on SNEP French Singles Chart.

In 2001, Kaysha introduces Lynnsha to Passi who signs her to his own label ISSAP Productions where she had her own self-titled debut album Lynnsha in June 2004. Her most successful single was "Hommes... femmes" taken from the album featuring D. Dy. It reached number 2 on French SNEP chart, also charting in Belgian and Swiss French markets.

In May 2008, she released her follow-up album Elle & moi with relative success.

In 2013 she releases her third album "Île et moi" on Kaysha's label Sushiraw. An album with the sonorities of her Island, Martinique.

Craig David invited her to do the French version of "Walking Away", whereas Nek did the Italian version, Álex Ubago the Spanish version and Monrose the German one.

2018 new album "Over & Other"

Discography

Albums

Singles

Featured in

as Dis L'Heure 2 Zouk

References

1979 births
Living people
Zouk musicians
French people of Martiniquais descent
21st-century French singers
21st-century French women singers